Coleophora halophilella is a moth of the family Coleophoridae. It is found in France, Italy, Austria, the Czech Republic, Slovakia, Hungary, Croatia, Romania, Poland, Ukraine, Greece, Crete and southern Russia.

The wingspan is about 14 mm.

Etymology
The species names refers to the halophilic traits of the species.

References

halophilella
Moths described in 1926
Moths of Europe